The situation of antisemitism in the People's Republic of China is complicated by the fact that historically there is no ground for antisemitism in China, and many insist that antisemitism has never existed in China, but some antisemitic conspiracy theories have begun to spread in recent decades. Some Chinese people believe that Jews secretly rule the world and are business-minded.

History 
Hongbing Song, a Chinese American IT consultant and amateur historian, published the Currency Wars series, believing Jewish financiers controlled the international banking systems since the era of Napoleon. Song also says in his book that the key functions of the Federal Reserve were ultimately controlled by five private banks, including Citibank, all of which maintained "close ties" with the Rothschild family, one Jewish group that led to the 1997 financial crisis. The book became a bestseller and even has been read by some high ranking Chinese officials.

According to the polls made by the Anti-Defamation League in 2014, roughly 20 percent of Chinese people have a negative attitude towards Jews, and the older people are, the more likely they are to have a negative perception of Jews. The May 2021 events in Gaza precipitated Chinese state-run media invoking antisemitic tropes and sentiments, encouraged by top Chinese diplomats, and rehashed by well-known Chinese political commentators. In particular, Israel's embassy in Beijing accused China Global Television Network of "blatant antisemitism" when it broadcast an antisemitic trope during the 2021 Israel–Palestine crisis.

Political blogger Sima Nan's Weibo channel spread the notion that Jews colluded with the Japanese to establish a Jewish homeland on Chinese territory during the Second Sino-Japanese War. In September 2021, BYD appointed Lu Kewen, an online influencer known for spreading antisemitic tropes, as a spokesperson for the company.

See also 
 Racism in China
 Shanghai Ghetto
 History of the Jews in China

References

Antisemitism in Asia
Jews and Judaism in China
People's Republic of China society